Mathieu Caplat (29 November 1886 – 15 August 1943) was a French racing cyclist. He rode in the 1920 Tour de France and 1921 Tour de France.

References

1886 births
1943 deaths
French male cyclists
Place of birth missing